The longfin sculpin (Jordania zonope) is a species of marine ray-finned fish belonging to the family Jordaniidae, a small family of sculpins. This species is found in the northeastern Pacific Ocean. This species is the only known member of its genus, Jordania.

Taxonomy
The longfin sculpin was first formally described in 1895 by the American ichthyologist Edwin Chapin Starks with its type locality given as Point Orchard in Puget Sound near Seattle, Washington. Starks classified this new species in the new monospecific genus Jordania. This genus is one of two monospecific genera classified within the family Jordaniidae.

Etymology
The longfin sculpin's genus name, Jordania, honours David Starr Jordan who Starks said was his "teacher in ichthyology". Starks did not explain his choice of specific name but in 1898 Jordan and Barton Warren Evermann suggested that it was a compound of zona, "zone" or "band", and opi, meaning "window" or "hole", an allusion to the dark bar, zona, zone (i.e., band), and opi, window (actually hole), referring to dark bar half as wide as eye, running from eye downward across cheek to anterior end of interopercle, edged on each side by a pale streak, half as broad as the eye, extending from the eye down over the cheek to froward end of interopercle.

Description
The longfin sculpin has a long slender body with a long anal fin and 2 dorsal fins. The dorsal fins contain 17 or 18 spines and between 15 and 17 soft rays while the anal fin contains 22 to 24 soft rays and no spines. The overall color of the body is olive-green broken with sinuous red bands on the back. The head has 3 stripes below the eye. The yellow-orange, long anal fin contrasts with the body. They chnage colour at night, darkening to gain better camouflage.

Distribution and habitat
The longfin sculpin is found in the eastern North Pacific Ocean occurring from Baranof Island in southeastern Alaska to Point Lobos in central California. It is a demersal fish found at depths of in rocky areas and among kelp.

Biology
The longfin sculpin is adapted morphologically and behaviorally to inhabit a variety of rock surfaces and to feed on an array of prey types. Their color and pattern blends well with their preferred habitats. They are mostly found on rock faces, and there its coloration helps to camouflage it from predators. Once the female the male darkens in color and guards the eggs mass. The diet of this fish is made up of benthic arthropods such as crabs, hermit crabs, isopods and shrimp These are broken up with bites rather than being swallowed entirely. they are also known to act as cleaner fish on largers fishes such as the lingcod (Ophidion elongatus).

References

Jordaniidae
Taxa named by Edwin Chapin Starks
Fish of the North Pacific
Fauna of Western Canada
Fish described in 1895
Monotypic fish genera